Doris "Doe" Burn (born Doris Wernstedt; April 24, 1923 – March 9, 2011) was an American children's book author and illustrator. She lived most of her life on Waldron Island in the San Juan Islands archipelago of Washington.

Life and career
Doris Wernstedt was born in Portland, Oregon, to Lage Wernstedt, an explorer, mountaineer and United States Forest Service worker, and his wife, Adele. The family resided on Guemes Island near Anacortes. After being interviewed by writer June Burn for the Bellingham Herald, the Wernstedt and Burn families became friends; the two families had nearby summer cabins on Waldron, a small island without ferry service.

Burn attended the University of Oregon and the University of Hawaii, and graduated from the University of Washington. She married South ("Bob") Burn after World War II and the couple made their home on Waldron Island. She had four children, whom she taught for one year on Guemes Island's one-room schoolhouse. Burn separated from her husband, but they remained lifelong friends and neighbors. Burn worked on her meticulous illustrations in the evenings, in "a small cabin where she spends the day at work after chopping enough wood to keep the fire going through the day, hauling two buckets of water from the pump for washing brushes and pens and brewing 'a perpetual pot of tea.'" Waldron Island was without electricity, telephone service, running water or merchants. All of her goods and supplies were brought by boat from the mainland. In 1956, Burn took a portfolio of illustrations to publishers in New York and was encouraged to continue working. Her children remember her working late nights by lantern-light with the fireplace burning down to embers.

Her oldest son, Mark Nathaniel Burn, was the inspiration for her first book, Andrew Henry's Meadow (1965), the story of a boy who, ignored by his family, builds a retreat for himself in a nearby meadow. He is soon joined by other children for whom he also builds houses, tailored to their interests and hobbies. Andrew Henry's Meadow won the Washington Governor's Art Award and was a Weekly Reader book club selection. It was reissued in a 40th anniversary edition by San Juan Publishing in 2005 and again by Philomel Books in 2012,. She went on to write The Summerfolk and The Tale of Lazy Lizard Canyon, and illustrated eight others.

Death
Doris "Doe" Burn died at her daughter's home in Bellingham, Washington on March 9, 2011, at the age of 87.

Legacy
The Burn family donated a collection of Doris' work to Western Washington University. The collection is made available by Western Libraries Heritage Resources.

Works

Author and illustrator

 Fortieth Anniversary Edition. (2005) Woodinville, WA: San Juan Publishing. 
,

Illustrator
Joseph Jacobs. Hudden and Dudden and Donald O'Neary. New York: Coward-McCann. 1968
Robert Nathan. Tappy. Knopf. 1968
Liesel Moak Skorpen. We Were Tired of Living in a House. New York: Coward-McCann. 1969
Patricia Lee Gauch. My Old Tree. New York: Coward-McCann. 1970
Patricia Lee Gauch. Christina Katerina & the Box. New York: Putnam & Grosset. 1971
Oscar Brand, When I Came First to this Land. New York: G. B. Putnam's. 1974

Film
Actor Zach Braff has been adapting Andrew Henry's Meadow into a film for Twentieth Century Fox since 2004. Barry Sonnenfeld signed on to direct the film in early 2010.

References

1923 births
2011 deaths
American children's writers
Writers from Portland, Oregon
People from Skagit County, Washington
University of Washington alumni
University of Oregon alumni
University of Hawaiʻi at Mānoa alumni
Writers from Washington (state)
American women children's writers
People from San Juan County, Washington
21st-century American women